Elias Uzamukunda (born 15 May 1991) is a Rwandan former professional footballer who played as a forward. In his home country of Rwanda, he is known as "Baby".

Club career

Early career 
Uzamukunda was born in Kigali, Rwanda. He became known for his performance at the 2009 African Youth Championship, which led to interest from French professional club Nantes. Uzamukunda joined the club on a trial basis and played on the club's reserve team, however, he was not signed. Prior to that, he played for AS Kigali and A.P.R. in his home country. In January 2010, he trialled with French third-tier club Cannes and was subsequently signed the same month.

Cannes 
Uzamukunda made his debut for Cannes on 7 May 2010 in a league match against Troyes appearing as a substitute in a 0–0 defeat. The following season, he scored his first goal for the club on 9 November against Créteil after appearing as a substitute 15 minutes prior. As a result of his goal, Cannes won the match 1–0.

International career 
Uzamukunda previously played for Rwanda U20 national team, participating at the 2009 African Youth Championship. The competition was played on home soil as Rwanda failed to progress out of the group stage. Uzamukunda scored his only goal in the competition in the team's opening 2–1 win over Mali.

Uzamukunda made his full international in debut with the Rwanda senior national team in 2006 and scored his first senior goal in the 2–1 quarter-final win over Tanzania at the 2006 CECAFA Cup. In 2008, the young striker appeared on the bench in several qualification matches with the senior team for the 2010 FIFA World Cup under manager Branko Tucak, but failed to make any appearances. Uzamukunda failed to make any appearances with the team in 2010, despite being called up for several matches.

Career statistics
Scores and results list Rwanda's goal tally first, score column indicates score after each Uzamukunda goal.

References

External links 
 
 Elias Uzamukunda - UNFP profile
 
 

1991 births
Living people
People from Kigali
Rwandan footballers
Rwanda international footballers
Association football forwards
AS Kigali FC players
APR F.C. players
AS Cannes players
Le Mans FC players
Rwandan expatriate footballers
Rwandan expatriate sportspeople in France
Expatriate footballers in France